js13kGames (also referenced as JS13K) is a game jam competition, focused on creating browser games that are no larger than 13 kilobytes when compressed using ZIP.
Participants are not permitted to use external services or libraries, and all assets must also fit within the size limit.
Games are programmed in JavaScript and HTML5.
The competition has a different theme each year and participants have the freedom to interpret it however they like.
Winners receive prizes consisting of money, digital rewards, T-shirts, and promotional items.

History 

JS13K was founded in 2012 and is run by Andrzej Mazur.
It is held from 13 August to 13 September annually.
Since 2017 there are categories that allow for certain frameworks to not count towards the size limit.
JS13k introduced a web monetization category in 2019 in partnership with Coil, which continued through 2020 funded partially by Grant for the Web.

Several well known game designers have participated in JS13K including Markus "Notch" Persson (creator of Minecraft) and Ricardo "Mrdoob" Cabello (creator of Three.js).
Some games created for the competition have later been released commercially on Steam including 2016 winner Evil Glitch. Others have been mentioned across the internet in various articles around the event itself.

In 2015, JS13K started to expand, including a panel of judges for each of their events. There are a few judges that have been featured in every single event, including Dann Sullivan of Pocket Gamer, Game Developer Christer Kaitilla, and Games Journalist Jupiter Hadley.

Results

References

External links 
 

Game jams
Programming contests
Video game development competitions
Recurring events established in 2012